is a Japanese football referee. He refereed a first round match between England and Tunisia in the 1998 FIFA World Cup.

References
Profile

1958 births
Japanese football referees
FIFA World Cup referees
Living people
Copa América referees
1998 FIFA World Cup referees
Association football people from Tokyo
AFC Asian Cup referees